Old Main is a historic academic building on the lower historic campus of Minnesota State University, Mankato in Mankato, Minnesota. Its main section, built in 1924, is dominated by a prominent Jacobethan tower, and is connected to an older 1908 building, now known as the Annex. It was built to replace the original old main (built 1870) also located in lower Mankato that was burned to the ground by a fire in 1922. These structures are the oldest surviving buildings on the original valley campus, which was the first site of the state's second normal school. The state legislature provided funding in 1923 for the development of the site. The 1924 building was designed by Clarence H. Johnston, then the state architect. It currently serves as a nursing home and clinical rotation site for nursing assistant programs in the area.

The building was listed on the National Register of Historic Places in 1983.

See also
National Register of Historic Places listings in Blue Earth County, Minnesota

References

National Register of Historic Places in Blue Earth County, Minnesota
School buildings on the National Register of Historic Places in Minnesota
Buildings and structures completed in 1908
Buildings and structures in Blue Earth County, Minnesota
Minnesota State University, Mankato
1908 establishments in Minnesota
Jacobethan architecture